George John Fiacchi (born 26 July 1964) is a former Australian rules footballer who played for the Port Adelaide Football Club in the South Australian National Football League (SANFL). During his career he won seven premierships for the club and was named best on ground during the 1990 SANFL Grand Final. Fiacchi's defensive partnership with full back Roger Delaney was exceptional, with the pair popularly being dubbed 'Batman' (Delaney) and 'Robin'. He has subsequently served on the board of Port Adelaide Football Club.

References

Living people
1964 births
Port Adelaide Football Club (SANFL) players
Port Adelaide Football Club players (all competitions)
South Australian State of Origin players
Australian rules footballers from South Australia